was a district located in Chiba Prefecture, Japan.

District Timeline
1878 - Founded after the former Sōma District areas designated within Chiba Prefecture.
1889 - At the time of municipal status enforcement, the district had 2 towns and 4 villages:
The towns of Abiko and Fussa, and the village of Kohoku (city of Abiko)
The village of Tomise (either the cities of Abiko or Kashiwa)
The villages of Tega and Fusō (Town of Shonan -> City of Kashiwa)
April 1, 1897 - Minamisōma District was merged into Higashikatsushika District. Therefore, Minamisōma District was dissolved as a result of this merger.

External links
List of dissolved districts of Japan
Kitasōma District, Ibaraki
Sōma District, Fukushima
Katsushika District

Former districts of Chiba Prefecture